The Savoia-Marchetti SM.75 Marsupiale (Italian: marsupial) was an Italian passenger and military transport aircraft of the 1930s and 1940s. It was a low-wing, trimotor monoplane of mixed metal and wood construction with a retractable tailwheel undercarriage. It was the last of a line of transport aeroplanes that Alessandro Marchetti began designing in the early 1930s. The SM.75 was fast, robust, capable of long-range flight and could carry up to 24 passengers for 1,000 miles.

Development

SM.75 and SM.75bis

The SM.75 was designed in response to an enquiry from the Italian airline Ala Littoria, which was seeking a modern, middle-to-long-range airliner and cargo aircraft as a replacement for its Savoia-Marchetti S.73 aircraft. Savoia-Marchetti chief designer Alessandro Marchetti (1884–1966) retained the general configuration of the S.73 but introduced retractable main landing gear to reduce aerodynamic drag. The SM.75s airframe consisted of a steel-tube frame with fabric and plywood covering, and its control surfaces were plywood-covered. The SM.75 had a four-man crew, and its cabin was built to accommodate up to 25 passengers. Its short take-off run of 337 metres (1,105 feet) and shorter landing distance of  meant that it could operate from short runways on secondary airfields.

The SM.75 was powered by three   Alfa Romeo 126 RC.34 radial engines. Eleven aircraft fitted with three  Alfa Romeo 126 RC.18 14-cylinder engines were designated SM.75bis.

The Regia Aeronautica (Italian Royal Air Force) was interested in the SM.75, resulting in the development of a militarized version. This had much smaller cabin windows and was reinforced for a dorsal gun turret, as well as being equipped with a retractable bomb aimer's cupola, and a bomb bay. It was powered by three Alfa Romeo 128 RC.21 engines and had a greater cargo capacity than the SM.75, and entered military service as the Savoia-Marchetti SM.82.

SM.76
The Italian airline LATI received its first SM.75 in 1939. The aircraft was redesignated as the SM.76 in 1940.

SM.87

In 1939, a floatplane version of the SM.75 was built as the SM.87, powered by three  Fiat A.80 engines. With a crew of four, it could accommodate 24 passengers. Four were built.

SM.90

The SM.90 was a version of the SM.75 fitted with more powerful  Alfa Romeo 135 R.C.32 engines. It had a longer fuselage than the SM.75. Only one was built.

SM.75GA

Operational history

Italian commercial service
The SM.75 first flew in November 1937 from Novara, in Piedmont. It entered commercial service with Ala Littoria in 1938 and with LATI in 1939, and was employed on services both within Europe and to South America, as well as on the Rome-Addis Ababa route established after the Italian invasion of Abyssinia (Ethiopia) following the Second Italo-Abyssinian War.

After Italy entered World War II on 10 June 1940, civil SM.75s continued to perform supply operations to Italian overseas territories, which dwindled as the war progressed. They also continued to operate to South America until December 1941, when Italy declared war on the United States.

Italian military service
After Italy entered World War II in June 1940, the Regia Aeronautica needed aircraft to maintain contact with Italian East Africa, which was surrounded by British-controlled territories. SM.75s were militarized with the installation of a  Breda-SAFAT machine gun mounted in a Caproni-Lanciani gun turret along with a fifth crew member for it, and new SM.75s were modified to carry up to 24 troops over long distances.

Special missions
There were several notable missions flown mainly for propaganda purposes.

Leaflet mission to Asmara
In January 1942, the commander-in-chief of the Regia Aeronautica, General Rino Corso Fougier, began planning a Rome-to-Tokyo flight. He consulted with pilots with recent experience in long-range flights, and chose the SM.75, being better suited than either the SM.82 or the Savoia-Marchetti SM.83 because of its superior endurance. An SM.75 was selected for the flight and was modified into the first long-range SM.75 GA.

The first mission of the SM.75 GA was to drop propaganda leaflets saying "Italian colonists, Rome is not forgetting you. We shall come back!" over Italian East Africa, which had been lost to the British between 1940 and 1941. 

The five-man crew flew left Rome at 17:30 hours on 7 May 1942, on their initial  leg. After 10 hours and 20 minutes, they arrived over Asmara (Eritrea) and released leaflets, but instead of continuing on to Benghazi in Italian Libya as planned, they returned to Rome. The flight took 28 hours.

Two days after arriving in Rome, the SM.75GA suffered a simultaneous failure of all three engines during a  ferry flight from Rome to Guidonia Montecelio. The aircraft was destroyed and the pilot lost a leg, while his crew escaped injury.

Rome-to-Tokyo flight

After the first SM.75 GA was lost, a second SM.75 was modified to SM.75 GA standard for the Rome-to-Tokyo flight. Ready on 9 June 1942, it was designated the SM.75 GA RT (for "Rome-Tokyo"). 

Its pilot was in charge of the operation, which in addition to providing Italy with much-needed propaganda, would carry new communications codes for Japan and their Axis partners as the existing codes had been compromised by the British. The extreme distance, much of it over the Soviet Union, with which Italy was at war, made the flight especially challenging. On 30 June 1942, the overloaded SM.75 GA RT made the difficult takeoff from the grassy  runway at Zaporizhzhia, with / of fuel. Its crew were under orders to burn the aircraft and its documents if forced down in enemy-held territory to avoid any incriminating documents becoming an embarrassment to the Japanese, who were not then at war with the Soviet Union. 

Operating under radio silence, they evaded Soviet anti-aircraft fire, a Soviet fighter (probably a Yakovlev Yak-1), and bad weather as they flew over the north coast of the Aral Sea, skirted Lake Balkhash and the Tarbagatai Mountains before continuing over the Gobi. A sandstorm was also encountered over Mongolia. The aircraft was repainted with Japanese roundels so that it would be safe in Japanese airspace, took an interpreter aboard, and then flew the final  to Tokyo.

The SM.75 GA RT departed Tokyo on its return journey on 16 July 1942. Arriving at Pao Tow Chien, its Japanese markings were removed and replaced with Italian ones. It took off on 18 July 1942 from Pao Tow Chien, retraced its route, and, after 29 hours and 25 minutes in the air and having covered , it landed at Odessa in the Ukraine before continuing on to Guidonia Montecelio. The Italians announced this achievement despite the Japanese government's reluctance for diplomatic reasons, which harmed relations between the two countries and the Italians made no attempt to repeat the flight.

Bombing mission to Abyssinia
Two SM.75 GA aircraft bombed American bombers at an airbase in Gura in Abyssinia, in 1943, the only bombing mission made by SM.75s. Experienced crews were selected and they started on 23 May 1943 from Rhodes, the easternmost Regia Aeronautica base at the time. The SM.75 GA's engines were optimized for economy rather than power making the take off difficult with the heavy load. Initially flying at low altitude, they climbed to  but having burned too much fuel one diverted to bomb Port Sudan instead. The second aircraft continued alone, arriving over Gura airbase with was found to be heavily defended despite being well behind the front lines. All but one of the bombs were successfully dropped before returning to Rhodes the next morning after having covered  in 24 hours and 15 minutes.

Italian Co-Belligerent Air Force
After Italy surrendered to the Allies in September 1943, some SM.75s entered service with the Italian Co-Belligerent Air Force, which fought on the Allied side for the remainder of World War II. The few SM.75s that survived the war and remained in service until 1949.

Hungary
Italy exported five SM.75 aircraft to Hungary for service with the Hungarian airline MALERT. After Hungary entered World War II, these aircraft were pressed into service with the Magyar Királyi Honvéd Légierő (MKHL), Hungarian Air Force.

1941 crash incident
In the afternoon of 12 April 1941 during the short conflict between Hungary and Yugoslavia, four SM.75s with paratroopers, departed Veszprém, however, the leading aircraft crashed killing 23 Hungarians, including 19 paratroopers. It was the heaviest loss in the war against Yugoslavia.

Germany
After Italy surrendered to the Allies in September 1943, Germany seized some SM.75s which served with the Luftwaffe.

Variants
SM.75
Civilian airliner and cargo aircraft; some later militarized for Regia Aeronatica use as cargo aircraft and troop transports
SM.75bis
Up-engined version of SM.75 civilian airliner
SM.75 GA
Long-range version of SM.75
SM.76
1940 redesignation of aircraft delivered to the Italian LATI airline
SM.87
Floatplane version of SM.75
SM.90
Re-engined version of SM.75 with longer fuselage

Operators

Military operators

 Luftwaffe operated captured former Regia Aeronautica aircraft.

 Royal Hungarian Air Force operated five former civilian MALERT airlines aircraft.

 Regia Aeronautica operated 32 former civilian aircraft.
 Italian Co-Belligerent Air Force

 Italian Air Force operated some Savoia-Marchetti SM.75 until 1949.

Civil operators

 Ala Littoria had 34 aircraft in operation by June 1940.

 MALERT bought five aircraft in Italy.

Specifications (SM.75 with Alfa Romeo engines)

Notes

Bibliography

 Angelucci, Enzo and Paolo Matricardi. World Aircraft: World War II, Volume I (Sampson Low Guides). Maidenhead, UK: Sampson Low, 1978. .
 Lembo, Daniele, gli ultimi voli sull'impero, Aerei nella storia n.23, April–May 2002.
 Neulen, Hans Werner. In The Skies Of Europe: Air Forces Allied To The Luftwaffe 1939-1945. Ramsbury, Marlborough, UK: The Crowood Press, 2000. .
 Pellegrino, Adalberto, Il raid segreto Roma-Tokyo, Storia militare n.45, June 1997.
 Rosselli, Alberto. "In the Summer of 1942, a Savoia-Marchetti Cargo Plane Made a Secret Flight to Japan." Aviation History. January 2004.
 Nakazawa, Akinori and Strippoli, Roberta, '1942-43: Italiani e Giapponesi in volo per rafforzare l'Asse Roma-Tokyo', Rivista Storica magazine Coop Giornalisti Storici, Rome, n.7/94, p. 48-53.

SM.075
1930s Italian airliners
1930s Italian military transport aircraft
Trimotors
Low-wing aircraft
Aircraft first flown in 1937